Shabkhus may refer to:
 Shabkhus Lat
 Shabkhus Pahlu
 Shabkhus Sara
 Shabkhus Lat Rural District